The Battle of Gingindlovu (uMgungundlovu) was fought on 2 April 1879 between a British relief column sent to break the Siege of Eshowe and a Zulu impi of King Cetshwayo.

Prelude
Charles Pearson had led the No. 1 Column of the British invasion force across the Tugela River with the intention of creating an advanced base at Eshowe. This they did, but found themselves besieged in the hastily constructed base, at a deserted Norwegian mission station. A relief column was organised, and under the leadership of Lord Chelmsford it departed Fort Tenedos on 29 March to march to Pearson's relief. The column composed 3,390 Europeans and 2,280 Africans, and a range of artillery, including two 9-pounders (4 kg), four 24-pounder (11 kg) rocket tubes and two Gatling guns.

Progress was slow, as Chelmsford took a roundabout route to avoid ambush in the close country Pearson had passed through. In addition, the rivers they had to traverse were swollen by heavy rains and fearing a repeat of Isandlwana, Chelmsford ensured his men spent much time laagering and entrenching their camp at the end of each day. Despite this slow progress, Pearson's observers at Eshowe could see the relief column laagering on the south bank of the Inyezane on the evening of 1 April. The laager was sited on a  ridge running roughly west–east. West of the ridge, the ground dipped, only to rise again to the  Umisi Hill.

The ground sloped away in all directions, allowing a good field of fire. While these defences were being constructed, a scout returned in the evening bearing news of Zulus massing on the far side of Umisi Hill. A second scouting party reported no forces there but that an impi was camped to the north west of the laager. While the scouts could not assess the Zulu strength because of the darkness, this impi was composed of 12,000 warriors, all of whom had been at Isandlwana. The impi had been ordered to ambush the relief column and had been thwarted by Chelmsford; this was their final chance to stop the column before it reached Eshowe. The night passed with no attack.

Battle

At dawn on 2 April 1879, the morning sun revealed muddy ground and a heavy mist. Chelmsford could not move his wagons until the ground dried out and sent out the Natal Native Contingent to provoke the Zulus into an attack, while he held a strong position. Once the mist lifted, the left horn of the impi was seen advancing eastwards over the river towards the British laager before disappearing into tall grass. A long burst of fire from one of the Gatling guns saw the warriors disappear into the long grass. When the left horn re-emerged it had joined the rest of the impi and the left horn, chest and right horn were advancing over Umisi Hill. The buffalo formation came in at a run on the three sides of the laager as Chelmsford wanted; at a range of  the British infantry opened fire, supported by the Gatling guns and rockets. Zulu marksmen caused a few casualties within the laager but the defenders kept the Zulus at bay. Though the Zulu regiments made persistent rushes to get within stabbing range, their charges lacked the drive and spirit that had pushed them forward at the Battle of Isandlwana and Rorke's Drift. The only Zulu to reach the laager was a 10-year-old boy, who was taken prisoner by members of the naval brigade and later served as a kind of mascot on their ship, . After twenty minutes, the impi began to crumble and Chelmsford ordered pursuit by the mounted troops and the native contingent. Large numbers of Zulu warriors were killed as they ran.

Aftermath

Analysis

The battle restored Chelmsford's confidence in his army and their ability to defeat Zulu attacks. With the last resistance between Chelmsford and Pearson's columns removed, he was able to advance and relieve Eshowe.

Casualties
By 07:30, the Zulus had fled and the grim task of killing Zulu wounded was undertaken. Around the laager 700 Zulu bodies were counted and 300 more were killed in the mounted chase of the retreating warriors. The British suffered eleven dead, including a lieutenant-colonel and 48 wounded.

See also
 Military history of South Africa

References

Bibliography

Further reading

External links
 Account of the battle – includes a map.
 Travellers Impressions

Gingindlovu
Battles of the Anglo-Zulu War
1879 in the Zulu Kingdom
History of KwaZulu-Natal
April 1879 events